Gaetano Mansi (July 20, 1956) is an Italian fashion and portrait photographer.

Career

Early career, education
He started his career in Salerno, working as an assistant  for Studio Segno, advertising agency founded by Pino Grimaldi. In the Seventies his main professional field was reportage. He is coauthor of Missus est Angelus, a photographic essay on John Paul II. The magazine Il Tempo Illustrato publishes his images of Rino Mele’s  avant-garde theater. In 1978 he contributes to the exhibit “Autodocumentazione”.  He gets a degree in Art History with a thesis on the history of fashion photography. He takes active part in the workshops at “Venezia 79 la fotografia”, sponsored by UNESCO.

1980s
In 1980 he contributed to the documentation of the earthquake in Irpinia(November  23rd 1980) flying over the disaster area on a helicopter. His reportages are published by the weekly magazine Epoca as well as many international periodicals. He takes part in the recognition of the historical buildings in Campania promoted by the Department of Restoration of Naples University. All the findings have been gathered in the volume “Oltre il Terremonto”. From 1981 on he starts to work for Casa Vogue magazine, thanks to the friendly intervention of his mentor Aldo Ballo. His contribution to Casa Vogue will go on for more than a decade. His works are also published by british Condé Nast House&Garden. With Alessandro Pinto he publishes the books Cilento and La Costa dei Miti.
Following his interest in  fashion photography he startscontributing to Vogue Italia.

1990s
In the Nineties he starts to work for Il Venerdì di Repubblica with portraits and reportages: among the others a shooting on Eva Herzigova in the Bahamas. While in Jerusalem for Il Venerdì he is assaulted and wounded by a terrorist. He is one of the very few surviving Westerners in the Intifada.<ref>{{cite news|title=‘’Israele, ferito fotografo Mansi|newspaper=Il L'Unione Sarda, Cagliari|date=30 April 1991|page=5}}</ref> His are the images  that launch Samarcanda, a successful TV show by Michele Santoro. He shoots fashion campaigns on location, from Africa to North America with top models and actresses like Linda Evangelista, Monica Potter, Melba Ruffo, Michelle Hunziker. He is coauthor of the book on the history of fashion photography La Fotografia di Moda tra Immagine e Rappresentazione. 

2000-present
From the year 2000 on he focuses exclusively on fashion, shooting in Italy and abroad for advertising campaigns and fashion magazines. 

He contributed to the volume Corso di Fotografia and prints the books 40 Volte Bianca, PassingThrough,Passing Through, Marte Editrice,Colonnella, 2013. CentoAsaGrana & Pixels. His exhibition "Grana & Pixels“ takes places in Rome in 2017.  It consists of 300 billboards posted  all over the city of Rome linked to an app that geolocalizes every one of them. 

From 2018 he is a contributor  for Diva e Donna magazine, with Daniela Rosa Cattaneo as fashion director.

Style
Gaetano Mansi's style has been influenced by the different genres he experimented  through the years. He prefers to shoot on location, often employing mixed light, natural and artificial. His images are almost always dynamic, never posing, with a particular attention to lighting and composition.

 Books  Missus est Angelus,  Il Laboratorio Edizioni, 1978, A day with Pope John Paul II Cilento, Comunità Montana Gelbison e Cervati, 1981 Oltre il Terremoto, Assessorato Pubblica Istruzione e Beni Culturali, 1982, Pictures from Irpinia Earthquake La Costa dei Miti, Comunità Montana Lambro Mingardo, 1982 Styles of living, the best of Casa Vogue,  Rizzoli, New York, 1985 La fotografia di moda tra immagine e rappresentazione,  EleaPress, 1992, A short history of fashion photography Corso Di Fotografia, National Geographic/Editoriale La Repubblica, 2000, Photography techniques 40 Volte Bianca, Marte Editrice, 2008 Passing Through, Marte Editrice, 2013 CentoAsa, Marte Editrice, 2017 Grana & Pixels, Marte Editrice, 2017 Faces and Souls, Caratteri, 2021 40 Volte Bianca, Caratteri-Made in Italy, 2022 54x70, Caratteri, 2022 Volti e Anime, Marte Editrice, 2022

 Publications 

 Casa Vogue 1982 : November
 1983 : October, November
 1984 : July-August, November
 1986 : August, November 
 1987 : May
 1988 : January
 1990 : November
 1991 : May

 Vogue Italia 
 1986 : December
 1987 : December
 1988 : September, December
 1989 : January, March, September, December
 1990 : March
 1991 : May

 Vogue Gioiello 
 1984 : November

 Vogue America 1985 : April

  House&Garden  
 1985 : May
 1986 : January

  Casa Vogue Antiques  1989 : May
 1991 : January

  Vogue Uomo Mare  1991 : January

  L’Uomo Vogue  1993 : July

  Il Venerdì  1992 : N.232,
 1996 : N.422, 426, 457
 1998 : N.622

  Mondo Sposa  1994 : September
 1995 : September

  First Class Japan  1994 : March

  Linea Intima   1995 : April

  Linea Sposi  1996 : January

  Sposarsi   1996 : January

  Where Miami  2000 : March

  Zoom  2002 : January

  Stilish Magazine Russia  2005 : April

  FHM Spagna  2006 : April

  Vintage Kazakistan  2014 : N.71
 2014 : N.77

  Fotografare  2016 : September

Exhibitions
 1978 : Autodocumentazione, retrospective exhibition, Sant’Apollonia Church , Salerno, Italy.
 2015 : Silent print,  Well Gallery, London College of Communication, London, United Kingdom.
 2017 : Grana & Pixels, widespread exhibition, Roma, Italy.
 2022 : 54x70, Teatro Antonio Ghirelli , Salerno, Italy
 2022 : Volti e Anime'', Treviso, Italy.

References

External links
Official website

Living people
1956 births
Fashion photographers